Air Rajneesh was a carrier based at Big Muddy Ranch Airport from 1981 to 1985.

There is very little known about the operations of Air Rajneesh except that its primary purpose was to bring cargo and new recruits to the Rajneeshee commune.  The Director of Operations was Ma Prem Patipada.

Fleet 
The known aircraft in Air Rajneesh's fleet, as of 1984, were:

 3 DC-3s
 1 Convair 240 (once owned by Howard Hughes)
 1 BN-2 Islander (the first plane added to Air Rajneesh)
 1 Helicopter (Military style)

Gallery

References

External links
 Operator: Air Rajneesh
 Air Rajneesh And The Rajneeshi Commune
 Air Rajneesh on Sannyas Wiki

Airlines established in 1985
Airlines disestablished in 1985
Rajneesh movement
Defunct airlines of the United States
Airlines based in Oregon